The Monoposto Racing Club is a single seater, open-wheeled motor racing club in the United Kingdom. Its members race a variety of single seater race cars ranging from 600cc Jedi's to 2000cc Formula Three and Formula Renault cars. Monoposto is Italian for 'Single Seater'. As of 2010, it is the largest single seater championship in the UK, with over 60 regular race entrants.

Production chassis must be 3 or more years old (unless home designed and built) and use standard road specification iron block engines.

It has several classes of cars: 1000, 1400, 1600, 1800, FR, Classic2000, 2000 and F3; these are based primarily on the maximum permitted engine size, but also engine tuning freedom, chassis age and chassis materials. Most race meetings have the classes spread over two grids, with the 1000 and 1400 cars on one, and the 2000  classes on another. The 1600 and 1800 classes are alternated between the two, either together or independently, depending on the circuit and expected entry numbers.

Termed 'The Friendly Club', the Monoposto Racing Club encourages both novice and experienced drivers to take part - indeed, novice drivers are made especially welcome, and competitors are usually more than willing to lend a hand (or tools) in the paddock to make a repair or adjustment, or to simply give advice. This is summed up nicely in the club profile.

The Championship visits most major UK race tracks, including Silverstone GP, Brands Hatch GP, Snetterton, Donington ParkGP, Oulton Park, Castle Combe, Pembrey and Rockingham.

It used to have an annual non-championship event at Spa-Francorchamps but rising costs lead to this being cancelled. The club also runs the autumn Tiedeman Trophy Championship, named after the club's founder Frank Tiedeman, who died in 2013. Occasional non-championship rounds are also run.

Points are scored for all finishers in their class order, with 15 for 1st place down to 1 for 12th are below. There is also a point for fastest lap in each class.  The championship is decided from the best 10-12 scores from  12-14 or so rounds. Events are generally run over 2 days with 4 track sessions per grid. This may be a separate qualification and race each day or a single qualification session and 3 race sessions.

Recent Monoposto Champions include Jim Blockley (6 times), Mark Harrison (3 times, and also 2003 British Sprint Champion), Robbie Watts (3 times ) ,Ewen Sergison (3 times), Tristan Cliffe (3 times), Robin Dawe (3 times), Tony Bishop ( 2 times )Neil Harrison (2 times), Phil Davis (2 times), Will Cox (2 times), Matt Jordan, Eddie Guest, Dan Clowes, Martin Wright, Geoff Fern, Chris Lord, Jason Timms, Chris Woodhouse and Jeremy Timms.

Class Structure

MotoMono

The Monoposto Racing Club has played a large role in the introduction of modern motorbike engined single seaters to UK race circuits. Approximately ten years ago the club regulations permitted motorcycle engined cars to race as part of the 1800cc class. At that time the 1000cc & 1400cc grid contained Jedi, re-engined chassis and even one of the Gordon Murray designed, road going, Rockets.

The 1000cc & 1400cc cars rapidly outpaced the other types in the 1800cc class. This was recognised by setting up a Mono1000 & 1400 class. At the time there were few purpose designed 1000 & 1400 cars. Mono1000 & 1400 regulations recognised this by being the only Monoposto class to allow new cars to race.
This is primarily for bike engined cars up to 1000cc with a minimum weight limit with driver of 400 kg, or with 1400cc and a 460 kg minimum weight limit. Mostly made up of Jedis and JKS/Speads chassis.

The 1000 and 1400 classes were introduced in 2009 as replacement for the 1200S and 1200F classes.

For 2012 the 1400 class was merged with the 1000 class to create MotoMono.

For 2016, the MotoMono class was split into Moto1000 and Moto1400.  Moto1400 was for any car wanting to run a carbon tub, or any spaceframed car wanting to run a bike engine in excess of 1000cc.  The dominating Dallara F3 derived cars moved into this class.  Moto1000 was for the traditional spaceframed Jedi/Speads type of car.

1600cc

Introduced in the late 1960s the Formula Ford 1600 class has been one of the most successful classes in the history of the sport. These cars are still racing today, with thousands of chassis produced and literally years of development to produce safe, reliable racing cars with superb drivability. For several decades Formula Ford chassis have been raced in the MRC. The current Mono 1600 class has its origins in the old "Mono Kent" class, long the core of the club. This class used either Formula Ford engines or Formula Ford engines with a special cam. Today, Formula Fords are still the backbone of the class, as well as Formula Vauxhall Junior 8V, 1700cc Formula Renaults and Scarab Euro Vee also eligible, but while engines remain strictly controlled and therefore cheap and readily available, modifications to the chassis are permitted, such as wings, tyres from other formulae and different size wheels. Minimum weights are around 505 kg-525 kg, depending on the engine used, to equalise performance. The 1600s are the lowest powered cars in the club, but as thoroughbred single seaters they are by no means slow. There are few road cars below £60,000 that can keep up with a Mono 1600, and indeed most racing saloons struggle to equal their lap times.

1800cc

A good case can be made for the Mono 1800 class being the best value class in the Monoposto Championship, this equates to some of the best value racing in the U.K. With 1800cc engines and a minimum weight of 535 kg a power:weight ratio of 250 hp/tonne is common, and makes the cars surprisingly quick. Given drivers of equal ability, a Mono 1800 is several seconds a lap faster than a Mono1600. Maintenance is limited to oil, brake & tyre changes & keeping the battery charged up, the fuel injection, with its pumps consumes a significant amount of electrical energy.

ZTEC
Cars conforming to full Formula Ford Zetec 1800cc specification, with exception of tyres can run in this class or in Mono1800 against modified examples. Introduced for 2013 season.   Merged with Mono1800 for 2014.

2000cc

For the majority of the last ten years the Mono2000 class has been the 'blue riband' class in the MRC. The class can claim one of the premier positions in the UK club single seater scene. These cars provide slicks and wings racing with the economy and reliability of a production 2000cc, 16v engine, in a state of tune that would be familiar to those driving the majority of road going Caterhams and Westfields that use similar engines. Frequently the fastest cars in the club, this caters for cars mostly built between 1994 and 2004 with a 2000cc engine and a 560 kg weight limit. Power outputs are around 185-195 hp, giving a power:weight ratio of around 330 hp/tonne.  Typically this class is dominated by Dallara F3 cars, usually with Vauxhall or Toyota engines running on carburettors as per the regulations rather than the original F3 injection and restrictor.

For 2010 the Monoposto Racing Club revised the regulations regarding fuelling, and have allowed the use of fuel injection via throttle bodies, with a maximum throttle diameter of 40mm per cylinder, through which all air must pass.  This limit is intended to maintain parity with carburetted engines, so that those not able or not wanting to use injection can remain fully competitive.

There are also a number of other changes to increase the number of cars on the grid - the age limit is now 2004, and sequential gearboxes and aluminium blocks are also allowed. The Mono Formula 2000 class will also merge into Mono2000 (with cars now required to use a 25mm restrictor, rather tham 24mm in 2009), effectively allowing F3 spec cars to race in Monoposto with only minor changes to the cars. Variable valve control engines are banned, even if the mechanism is deactivated.

Formula Renault 2000 cars are allowed to race, but must be in BARC specification, using the 'Blue' 37mm restrictor. This ensures the cars have balanced engine outputs.

Classic 2000cc

A new class for 2008 (although it was trialled in 2007), this class uses the same regulations as Mono2000 (although the 2010 changes allowing fuel injection have not passed down to the Classic class), but has an age limit to restrict it to the older cars - typically pre-1993 (although exceptions apply up to 1999 for some makes).  In 2008 this was probably the largest class at any race meeting. Formula 3 cars or Formula Vauxhall Lotus chassis are the most popular and most competitive.

Mono 2000 Formula

A trial class for 2009. This class allowed Formula Renault 2000 and Formula 3 spec cars (with smaller restrictors) to race on the same grid as the other two litre cars, but without upsetting the class balance until the competitiveness of the cars is determined with the 'Mono Spec' cars (those with standard road engines). The class was integrated with Mono2000 in 2010.

List of Past Monoposto Championship Winners

Note: Class titles are correct for current classes, and may not reflect the class names or structure that earlier championships were won under.

References

External links
 Monoposto Racing Club - Club website
 StartlineOnLine - The Club's 'e-magazine'
 F3 History - a look at what happened, and when in Formula 3

Motorsport organisations in the United Kingdom
Auto racing series in the United Kingdom
Clubs and societies in the United Kingdom
Formula racing series
Formula racing